Hawthorn is a suburb of Adelaide, South Australia, in the City of Mitcham. It is bounded to the north by Cross Road, to the south by Grange Road, to the west by Sussex Terrace and to the east by Belair Road. The Belair train line runs through the suburb. To the west is Westbourne Park, and to the east is Kingswood. 

Hawthorn is an upper-middle-class suburb, with a median weekly income of $1,475. The median household price is the fifteenth-highest in the city, at approximately $1,012,700.

Several parks are situated here, including the Mitcham Memorial Gardens. The closest primary school to the suburb is Mitcham Primary School and the nearest high schools are Unley High School and Mitcham Girls High School. Private schools such as Scotch College and Mercedes College are also close by.

References

 

Suburbs of Adelaide